Emilio Foriscot (1904–2001) was a Spanish cinematographer. He worked on over a hundred film productions during his career.

Selected filmography
 Heart of Gold (1941)
 We Thieves Are Honourable (1942)
 A Famous Gentleman (1943)
 The Guitar of Gardel (1949)
 The Troublemaker (1950)
 Forbidden Trade (1952)
 Persecution in Madrid (1952)
 Spanish Fantasy (1953)
 Daughter of the Sea (1953)
 Bronze and Moon (1953)
 It Happened in Seville (1955)
 Fountain of Trevi (1960)
 An American in Toledo (1960)
 The Two Rivals (1960)
 Stop at Tenerife (1964)
 Honeymoon, Italian Style (1966)
 Mutiny at Fort Sharpe (1966)
 Camerino Without a Folding Screen (1967)
 The Mark of the Wolfman (1968)
 Cry Chicago (1969)
 The Tigers of Mompracem (1970)
 May I Borrow Your Girl Tonight? (1978)

References

Bibliography 
  H. Mario Raimondo-Souto. Motion Picture Photography: A History, 1891–1960. McFarland, 2006.

External links 
 

1904 births
2001 deaths
Spanish cinematographers
People from the Province of Zaragoza